Pović is a surname. Notable people with the surname include:

 Mirjana Pović (born 1981), Serbian astrophysicist
 Miloš Pović, nobleman who held a disputed zone that included Zvečan in 1370

See also
 Povich

Slavic-language surnames